

A gable is the portion of a wall between the lines of a sloping roof.

Gable may also refer to:

People
 Gable (surname), a surname
 Gable Garenamotse (born 1977), Botswana long jumper

Places in the United States
 Gable Field, part of Doc Wadley Stadium, Oklahoma
 Gable Mansion, Woodland, California
 Gable Mountain, Montana

Other uses
 Gable hood, an English woman's headdress
 Gable stone, an ornament in Dutch architecture

See also
 Great Gable, English mountain
 Green Gable, English fell
 Gableboat, a traditional Norwegian fishing vessel
 Gabel (disambiguation)
 Gables (disambiguation)